Dennis Daube (born 11 July 1989) is a German professional footballer who plays as a defensive midfielder for SC Preußen Münster.

Career
Daube was born in Hamburg. In July 2015, after eleven years with FC St. Pauli, Daube moved to fellow 2. Bundesliga side Union Berlin on a free transfer signing a two-year contract until 2017.

References

External links
 
 

1989 births
Living people
Footballers from Hamburg
German footballers
Association football midfielders
FC St. Pauli players
1. FC Union Berlin players
KFC Uerdingen 05 players
SC Preußen Münster players
Bundesliga players
2. Bundesliga players
3. Liga players
Regionalliga players